Until Next Spring is a 1960 Soviet drama film directed by Viktor Sokolov.

Plot 
The film tells about the student of the institute who is deceived by her close person. This led to the fact that she became suspicious of the people around her and, as a result, she decided to leave the institute and go with her daughter to the village, where she met a high school teacher, Alexei Nikolayevich, an exceptionally kind and sympathetic person who helped her change her views on life for the better.

Cast 
 Lyudmila Marchenko as Vera
 Innokentiy Smoktunovskiy as Aleksey
 Galina Vasilyeva as Natasha (as G. Wassilewa)
 Vladimir Andreyev as Vasiliy (as Wadim Andrejew)
 Mariya Prizvan-Sokolova as Nastya
 Valentin Arkhipenko as father of Vera (as V. Arkhipenko)
 Nikolai Novlyansky
 Klarina Frolova-Vorontsova
 A. Yatsenko
 Igor Bogdanov

References

External links 
 

1960 films
1960s Russian-language films
Soviet drama films
1960 drama films